Rainy Day may refer to:

Music
Rainy Day (band), a Paisley Underground band from the 1980s
Rainy Day (album), a 1965 album by jazz trombonist Kai Winding

Songs
"Rainy Day", a song by Ice Nine Kills from their album The Silver Scream 2: Welcome to Horrorwood
"Rainy Day", a song by Fool's Garden from their album Go and Ask Peggy for the Principal Thing
"Rainy Day", a song by Ayumi Hamasaki from her album (Miss)understood
"Rainy Day", a song by Coldplay from their EP Prospekt's March
"Rainy Day", a song by The Corrs as a B-side to "Love to Love You"
"Rainy Day", a song by America from their eponymous debut album
"Rainy Day", a song by The Rascals, the B-side to the single "A Beautiful Morning"
"Rainy Day", a song by 10,000 Maniacs from their 1997 album Love Among the Ruins
"Rainy Day," a song by Janel Parrish from the 2007 film Bratz
"Rainy Day", a song by Plain White T's from their 2008 album Big Bad World

Other uses
Rainy day fund, money to be used in times when regular income is disrupted
"Rainy Day", an episode of the American children's television program Pee-wee's Playhouse
Rainy Day  (videogame), a game by Thais Weiller
"Rainy Day", a poem by The Wiggles on their 1992 album Here Comes a Song

See also
Rainy Days (disambiguation)
Paris Street; Rainy Day, an 1877 oil painting by the French artist Gustave Caillebotte
"Here's That Rainy Day", a 1953 song by Jimmy Van Heusen and Johnny Burke
"Rainy Day Women No. 12 & 35", a 1966 song by Bob Dylan
"Rainy Day, Dream Away", a 1968 song by The Jimi Hendrix Experience